William Williamson (1645-1722) was an Irish Anglican priest in the late seventeenth century and the first three decades of the eighteenth.

Williamson was born in Dublin and educated at Trinity College Dublin. He was  Archdeacon of Glendalough from 1762 until his death

Notes

17th-century Irish Anglican priests
18th-century Irish Anglican priests
Archdeacons of Glendalough
Alumni of Trinity College Dublin
Christian clergy from Dublin (city)
1645 births
1722 deaths